Rolando Marchinares (born 22 November 1966) is a Peruvian weightlifter. He competed at the 1988 Summer Olympics and the 1992 Summer Olympics.

References

External links
 

1966 births
Living people
Peruvian male weightlifters
Olympic weightlifters of Peru
Weightlifters at the 1988 Summer Olympics
Weightlifters at the 1992 Summer Olympics
Place of birth missing (living people)
20th-century Peruvian people
21st-century Peruvian people